Fatou Niang Siga (1932-2022) was a Senegalese author and schoolteacher. She was a Mouride Muslim and has made the hajj to Mecca twice.  She was married and had twelve children. Her daughter Maïmouna Sourang Ndir served as Senegal's ambassador to France.<ref>'Le Quotidien (Senegal), 'DON – 1 240 ouvrages offerts aux cinq universités publiques du Sénégal : L’acte hautement social et civique de Fatou Niang Siga, by Gilles Arsène Tchedji (9 December 2016)  (retrieved 18 August 2020)</ref>

Her writing has revolved around her native Saint-Louis, Senegal.

Selection of works
The following are a selection of her works:Saint-Louis du Sénégal et sa mythologie, Midi/Occident (2006)Costume saint-louisien sénégalais d'hier à aujourd'hui (2006)Kija: chungu cha mwana mwari wa Giningi, Issues 1-3, by Niang Fatou Niang Siga, Novati Rutenge, Shani Abdallah Kitogo, published by Taasisi ya Uchunguzi wa Kiswahili, Chuo Kikuu cha Dar es Salaam, 200?,Reflet de modes et traditions Saint-Louisiennes'' (Dakar, 1990)

References

Bibliography
 [Reflections of the fashions and traditions of Saint-Louis]. Dakar: Khoudia, 1990. (141p.). Essay.

External links
UWA

1932 births
Living people
Senegalese non-fiction writers
People from Saint-Louis, Senegal
Senegalese Muslims
Senegalese women writers